General Polk may refer to:

James H. Polk (1911–1992), U.S. Army four-star general
Leonidas Polk (1806–1864), Confederate States Army major general
Lucius E. Polk (1833–1892), Confederate States Army brigadier general
Thomas Polk (c. 1732–1794), North Carolina Militia brigadier general in the American Revolutionary War